The Nations Cup 1970-71 was the 11th edition of a European rugby union championship for national teams, and sixth with the formula and the name of "Nations Cup".

The tournament was won by France, who swept all their matches.

First division 
 Table

Italy relegated to division 2

Results

Second Division

Pool 1 
Table

Results

Pool 2 
Table

Results

Final 
(Belgium directly admitted)

Table

Czechoslovakia promoted in first division

Results

Bibliography 
 Francesco Volpe, Valerio Vecchiarelli (2000), 2000 Italia in Meta, Storia della nazionale italiana di rugby dagli albori al Sei Nazioni, GS Editore (2000) 
 Francesco Volpe, Paolo Pacitti (Author), Rugby 2000, GTE Gruppo Editorale (1999).

References

External links
 FIRA-AER official website

1970–71 in European rugby union
1970–71
1971 rugby union tournaments for national teams
1970 rugby union tournaments for national teams